Thomas Fuller, M.D. (24 June 1654 – 17 September 1734) was a British physician, preacher and intellectual.

Fuller was born in Rosehill, Sussex, and educated at Queens' College, Cambridge. He practised medicine at Sevenoaks.
In 1723 he published Pharmacopoeia Domestica, and in 1730 Exanthematologia, Or, An Attempt to Give a Rational Account of Eruptive Fevers, Especially of the Measles and Small Pox. In 1732 he published a compilation of proverbs titled Gnomologia: Adagies and Proverbs; wise sentences and witty saying, ancient and modern, foreign and British (321 pp., London: Barker and Bettesworth Hitch) which includes the words, "Be you never so high, the law is above you".

Works
Pharmacopœia Extemporanea: or, a body of medicines, containing a thousand select prescripts, answering most intentions of cure. To which are added useful scholia, a catalog of remedies, and copious index, for the assistance of young physicians.
Introductio ad Prudentiam: or, Directions, Counsels, and Cautions, Tending to Prudent Management of Affairs in Common Life.

References

External links

Full Text of Gnomologia: Adages and Proverbs

1654 births
1734 deaths
Alumni of Queens' College, Cambridge